The MS Pride of Winchester, was a UK Ro-Ro/Passenger ferry, which was part of P&O European Ferries' fleet. She was built in 1975 by Aalborg as the Viking Viscount for Townsend Thoresen and was put into service by P&O European Ferries in 1989, when European Ferries Group was purchased by P&O. She was named after Winchester, a city in Hampshire, England.

The ship was used on the Portsmouth to Cherbourg route until 1994 when she was replaced by a bigger ship, the original Pride of Le Havre. She also operated on the Calais-Dover line. In 1995 was sold from a Greek company Lane Sea Lines for the Piraeus, Milos, Agios Nikolaos, Sitia. Then the ship did the Piraeus, Kithira, Antikythera, Githio, Kalamata, Kisamos. During the Summer of 2017 Vitsentzos Kornaros had a problem with her engines and then was laid-up in Kinosoura, Greece. In April 2020 Vitsentzos Kornaros sold for scrap in Aliaga, Turkey.

Characteristics 
Vitsentzos Kornaros could hold a total of up to 1200 passengers and 275 private cars. and was powered by three main engines (2 Werkspoor 8TM410 and 1 Werkspoor 9TM410 diesel). with a combined power of 10,655 KW and reached speeds of up to 18 knots. She had stabilizers for sailing in wild sea and -after coming to Greece- cabins for night routes. Her capacity was 6,387 gt.

History 
The ship was built in 1976 in Denmark as the Viking Viscount for Townsend Thoresen. In 1989, with the creation of P&O European Ferries (which succeeded Townsend Thoresen) she received the name Pride of Winchester. In 1994, she came to Greece, bought by LANE Sea Lines and underwent a small-scale reconstruction to which cabins were added. Her first route was Piraeus - Milos - Agios Nikolaos - Sitia, but along the way she was launched on other lines such as the line Piraeus-Milos-Santorini-Anafi-Crete-Kaso-Karpathos-Halki-Rhodes and Piraeus-Gythio-Kythira-Antikythira-Kissamos, sometimes approaching Kalamata. The ship also operated at the Rhodes-Alexandroupolis link.

The end 
On June 16, 2017, after 41 years of uninterrupted operation, the ship was stranded in Piraeus due to a mechanical breakdown. The company hoped she would be repaired by June 30, but the damage was large and the company could not allocate money to repair her, while in case of final withdrawal would have to pay a clause of 480,000 euros. On July 17, it was declared abandoned by the line of Kythera and a tender was announced for the launch of a new ship. In September 2017, she was transferred to Kinosura, Salamina, and at the end of February 2019, a tender was announced for her removal, which was fruitless, while others followed. Finally, in 2020, she was sold to Turkish shipbreakers and was towed to the Aliaga scrap yard for dismantling.

Unsolved

Kevin Dundon, from Essex, aged 22 went missing while on the vessel returning to Felixstowe from Zeebrugge in Belgium, on 21 September 1980.

References

Further reading 

1975 ships